Thomas E. Huntley (born February 10, 1938) is a Minnesota politician and former member of the Minnesota House of Representatives. A member of the Minnesota Democratic–Farmer–Labor Party (DFL), he represented District 7A, which includes portions of the city of Duluth in St. Louis County in the northeastern part of the state. He is a retired associate professor of biochemistry and molecular biology at the University of Minnesota Duluth and former director of Institutional Relations at the University's School of Medicine.

Early life, education, and career
Huntley graduated from Cretin High School in Saint Paul, and attended the University of Minnesota, receiving his B.S. in chemistry in 1960. He earned his Ph.D. in biochemistry from the University of Iowa in Iowa City in 1970.

Prior to being elected to the legislature, Huntley was active in Twin Ports area government. He served on the Minnesota Great Lakes Commission, on the Duluth City Council (1984–1988), and as a commissioner on the Minnesota Seaway Port Authority of Duluth (1988–1993). He was also the president of the Seaway Port Authority from 1990-1992.

Minnesota House of Representatives
Huntley was first elected to the Minnesota legislature in 1992. He was the chair of the Finance Subcommittee for the Health Care and Human Services Finance Division from 2007 to 2010. He was a member of the Governor's Joint Health Care Task Force, of the Legislative Commission on Health Care Access, and of the Task Force on Small Business Health Insurance. He announced on December 17, 2013 that he would not be seeking re-election in 2014.

Personal life
His wife, Gail, is a former DFL Party activist and state associate chair.

Huntley was arrested on February 2, 2013, near Deerwood, Minnesota, on suspicion of driving under the influence of alcohol after being stopped for speeding. He subsequently announced that he was guilty of the charge, intended to plead guilty, and apologized to constituents for his actions.

References

External links 

 Rep. Tom Huntley official Minnesota House of Representatives website
 Minnesota Public Radio Votetracker: Rep. Thomas Huntley
 Project Votesmart - Rep. Thomas Huntley Profile

1938 births
Living people
University of Minnesota College of Science and Engineering alumni
Politicians from Duluth, Minnesota
Democratic Party members of the Minnesota House of Representatives
21st-century American politicians